Datia State was a princely state in subsidiary alliance with British India.

The state was administered as part of the Bundelkhand Agency of Central India. It lay in the extreme north-west of Bundelkhand, near Gwalior, and was surrounded on all sides by other princely states of Central India, except on the east where it bordered upon the United Provinces.

History

Datia had formerly been a  state in the Bundelkhand region founded in 1626. The ruling family were Rajputs of the Bundela clan; they descended from a younger son of a former raja of Orchha.

It was second highest in the rank of all the Bundela states after Orchha, with a 17-gun salute, and its Maharajas bore the hereditary title of Second of the Princes of Bundelkhand. The land area of the state was  its population in 1901 was 53,759. It enjoyed an estimated revenue of £2,00,000. The state suffered from famine in 1896–97, and again to a lesser extent in 1899–1900.

After India's independence in 1947, the Maharaja of Datia acceded unto the Dominion of India; it later merged with the Union of India. Datia, together with the rest of the Bundelkhand agency, became part of the new state of Vindhya Pradesh in 1950. In 1956, Vindhya Pradesh state was merged with certain other areas to form the state of Madhya Pradesh within the Union of India.

Rulers

Raos
The following rulers carried the title "Rao":
 1626 - 1656: Rao Bhagwan singh
 1656 - 1683: Rao Subha Karan singh
 1683 - 1706: Rao Dalpal singh
 1706 – 1733: Rao Ramchandra Singh 
 1733 – 1762: Rao Indrajit Singh
 1762 – 1801: Rao Shatrujit Singh

Rajas
The following rulers carried the title "Raja":
1801 – 1839: Raja Parichhat Singh
1839 – 20 Nov 1857: Bijai Singh
1857 – 1865: Bhavani Singh (b. 1846 – d. 1907)

Maharajas
The following rulers carried the title "Maharaja Sir Lokendra". The title came into effect from the year 1877:
1865 – Jul 1907: Bhavani Singh Judeo Bahadur (s.a.)
5 August 1907 – 15 August 1947: Govind Singh Judeo Bahadur G.C.I.E.  K.C.S.I. (b. 1886 – d. 1951)

Heads of the family in the Republic Of India 
1947 – 1951: Govind Singh Judeo
1951 – 1978: Balbhadra Singh Judeo
1978 – 2006: Kishan Singh Judeo
2006 – 2020: Rajendra Singh Judeo
2020 – present: Arunaditya Singh Judeo

Postal/Philatelic Information
From 1893 there were primitive stamps bearing the name 'DUTTIA STATE' and also 'DATIA STATE'. The first issue is among the rarest of all Indian princely state stamps. A total of 29 series of stamps were issued until 1920. From 1921 only Indian Stamps were valid.

See also
Datia District
Datia Palace

References

External links

Princely states of Bundelkhand
1626 establishments in India
1950 disestablishments in India
States and territories disestablished in 1950
States and territories established in 1626
Datia district
Rajputs